This is a list of B-grade roads in Sri Lanka sorted by route number.

See also 
 Transport in Sri Lanka
 List of A-Grade Roads in Sri lanka

References

 B
Sri Lanka
Highways